A structured note is an over the counter derivative with hybrid security features which combine payoffs from multiple ordinary securities, typically a stock or bond plus a derivative. 
When the product depends on a credit payoff, it is called a credit-linked note.
Since no such security exists outside of the sponsor creating this hybrid, the creditworthiness of this structured note depends on the strength of the sponsor.

Two typical use cases:
A simple example of a structured note would be a five-year bond tied together with an option contract. The addition of the option contract changes the security's risk/return profile to make it more tailored to an investor's comfort zone. This makes it possible to invest in an asset class that would otherwise be considered too risky.

From the investor's point of view, a structured note might look like this: I agree to a three-year contract with a bank. I give the bank $100. The money will be indexed to the S&P 500. In three years, if the S&P has gone up, the bank will pay me $100 plus the gain in the S&P. However, if the S&P has gone down, the bank will pay me back the entire $100 – an advantage known as downside protection. (In reality the downside protection is usually "contingent", i.e. it only applies up to a certain threshold amount. For example, with a threshold of 40%, if the S&P has gone down by more than 40%, the bank will no longer pay me back $100, but instead it will pay me the proportional value indexed to the S&P – e.g. $55 if the S&P has gone down by 45%.)

See also
 Structured product
 Credit-linked note
 Equity-linked note 
 Floating rate note
 Inverse floating rate note
 Market-linked note

References

Derivatives (finance)
Structured finance

es:Notas estructuradas